Naum Elias Yaqub Palakh (February 1868 – February 5, 1930), better known as Naum Faiq (Naˁum Fayëq), was one of the founding fathers of modern Assyrian nationalism during the early 20th century. He was a teacher and writer throughout his life. As a Syriac Orthodox Christian, he emphasized the importance of unity among Syriac Christians and encouraged his community to depart from "tribal mentality."

Early life
He was born in Diyâr-ı Bekr (present day Diyarbakir) in the Ottoman Empire and began his education there at the age of seven. After primary school, he attended the local high school that had been established by local "Brotherhood of Ancient Syrians". He spent 8 years at the school, where education was jointly in classical Syriac, Ottoman Turkish and Arabic. Naum also went on to learn several other languages, including Persian and basic French. After his parents died, he first lived with his older brother Thomas and then started teaching in a village near Diyarbakır in 1888. He also taught in Urfa, Adıyaman and Homs before returning to Diyarbakır.

Literary works
Naum wrote numerous books concerning the Syriac language and people. After the 1908 Young Turk Revolution and the proclamation of the second Ottoman constitution, restrictions on freedom of speech were lifted. In 1910, Naum began publishing a newspaper for the Orthodox, Catholic and Protestant Syriac communities, entitled Kawkab Madnho ("Star of the East"). While written entirely in the Syriac alphabet, Star of the East was actually tri-lingual with articles in Ottoman Turkish, classical Syriac and Arabic. This newspaper, along with that of Ashur Yousif, signaled the emergence of Assyrian nationalism in the Syriac Christian communities of the Ottoman Empire.

After the Ottoman Empire and Italy began to fight over the province of Libya in 1911, Naum like other Christians in the region felt a backlash from the Muslim community and in 1912, he fled to United States, where he began to write for the newspaper Intibah ܐܢܬܒܗ (Cirutho ܥܝܪܘܬܐ, in English: Awakening), published by Gabriel Boyaji from 1909-1915. He went on to establish various Assyrian newspapers including Beth-Nahrin in 1916 and became the head of the editorialship of Huyodo, a magazine that is still published today under the same name in by the Assyrian Federation in Sweden.

Death
The death of his wife in 1927 affected Naum very much. He died in New Jersey in 1930 due to lung disease.
"Naum Faiq" day is celebrated yearly on February 5. Ceremonies are usually held in Syria, United States, and in various European nations.

Poems

Awake, son of Assyria
His most famous poem is titled "Awake, son of Assyria, awake!" (ܐܬܬܥܝܪ ܒܪ ܐܬܘܪ ܐܬܬܥܝܪ).

Homeland

See also
Farid Nazha
Assyrian nationalism
List of ethnic Assyrians/Chaldeans/Syriacs

References

1868 births
1930 deaths
Assyrian nationalists
Syriac writers
Syriac Orthodox Christians
Turkish Oriental Orthodox Christians